James Edward Michaels (May 30, 1926 – September 21, 2010) was the Catholic Titular bishop of Verbe and auxiliary bishop of the Diocese of Wheeling-Charleston, West Virginia.

Born in Chicago, Illinois, Michaels was ordained to the priesthood on December 21, 1951, for the Missionary Society of St. Columban. On February 15, 1973, he was appointed auxiliary bishop of the Archdiocese of Kwangju, South Korea and was ordained on April 15, 1973, by Archbishop Leo Binz of Saint Paul. The principal co-consecrators were Archbishop Harold Henry, S.S.C.M.E. of Kwangju and Bishop William O'Connor of Springfield in Illinois.

On April 3, 1977, he was appointed auxiliary bishop of the Wheeling-Charleston diocese, resigning on September 22, 1987.

References 

Clergy from Chicago
American Roman Catholic missionaries
Roman Catholic missionaries in South Korea
20th-century American Roman Catholic titular bishops
20th-century Roman Catholic bishops in South Korea
Roman Catholic Diocese of Wheeling-Charleston
1926 births
2010 deaths
Religious leaders from West Virginia
American expatriates in South Korea
Catholics from Illinois